Emerson Santos may refer to:

 Emerson Santos (footballer, born 1992), Brazilian football attacking midfielder
 Emerson Santos (footballer, born 1995), Brazilian football centre-back